WLLM (1370 AM) is a radio station broadcasting a Christian Radio format. Licensed to Lincoln, Illinois, United States, the station is owned by Great News Radio, through licensee Good News Radio, Inc. WLLM's format consists of Christian talk and teaching and Christian music.

History
The station began broadcasting in April 1951, and it held the call sign WPRC. It ran 500 watts during daytime hours only, and was owned by Prairie Radio Corporation. In 1969, the station was sold to the Virginia Broadcasting Corporation for $255,000, and its power was increased to 1,000 watts. WPRC aired a full service-MOR format in the 1970s. By 1980, the station had adopted a country music format. In 1984, it was sold to Capital Broadcasting, along with WLRX, for $475,000. In 1990, it was sold to L&M Broadcasting, along with WESZ, for $390,000. In 1994, the station was sold to Central States Network, along with WESZ, for $700,000.

WPRC continued to air a country format into the 1990s. On February 1, 1995, the station's call sign was briefly changed to WNCY, but on March 20, 1995, it was changed back to WPRC. In 1996, the station's call sign was changed to WVAX, and it adopted a news-talk format, simulcasting AM 1240 WTAX during most hours, but airing a local show mornings. The station was sold to Saga Communications the following year.

In 1999, the station's call sign was changed to WLLM, and it adopted an adult standards format. In 2003, the station was purchased by Cornerstone Community Radio for $275,000, and it adopted a Christian format. In 2019, the station was sold to Good News Radio. The sale, which included six sister stations and seven translators, was consummated on February 12, 2020 at a price of $1.1 million.

Translator
WLLM is also heard at 105.3 MHz, through a translator in Lincoln, Illinois.

References

External links
WLLM's website

Query the FCC's FM station database for W287BP
Radio-Locator Information on W287BP

LLM (AM)
Radio stations established in 1951
1951 establishments in Illinois